Clark's Hill/Norton State Historic Site is located on the eastern edge of Jefferson City Missouri, United States. The park preserves one of the campsites used by the Lewis and Clark Expedition as well as a lookout point from which William Clark viewed the confluence of the Osage and Missouri rivers. American Indian burial mounds may also be seen at the site. The site was donated to the state by Jefferson City residents William and Carol Norton in 2002 and opened to the public in 2004.

References

External links
Clark's Hill/Norton State Historic Site Missouri Department of Natural Resources 
Clark's Hill/Norton State Historic Site Trail Map Missouri Department of Natural Resources 

Protected areas of Cole County, Missouri
Missouri State Historic Sites
Protected areas established in 2002
2002 establishments in Missouri